Dilskiye is a rural locality (a village) in Semizerye Rural Settlement, Kaduysky District, Vologda Oblast, Russia. The population was 10 as of 2002.

Geography 
Dilskiye is located 49 km northwest of Kaduy (the district's administrative centre) by road. Kuzminka is the nearest rural locality.

References 

Rural localities in Kaduysky District